The Northern Arizona Wranglers are a professional indoor football team based in Prescott Valley, Arizona.  They are members of the Indoor Football League and play their home games at the Findlay Toyota Center in Prescott Valley beginning in the 2021 season.

History
On August 25, 2020, the Indoor Football League (IFL) held a press conference at the Findlay Toyota Center to announce a new expansion team in Prescott Valley. The team is the third IFL franchise in the state of Arizona, along with the Arizona Rattlers and Tucson Sugar Skulls, for the 2021 season.  They will be the third indoor football team to play in Prescott Valley.  The Arizona Adrenaline played in the American Indoor Football Association before that in 2008 and also played in the IFL in 2011.  The Arizona Outlaws played in the AIF in 2012.

The team hired Dominic Bramante as the inaugural head coach after previously serving in the same role with the Duke City Gladiators, winning the Champions Indoor Football title in 2018 and 2019. On October 6, 2020, the team name was announced as the Northern Arizona Wranglers.

Former Jacksonville Sharks and Iowa Barnstormers head coach Les Moss was named the head coach for the 2022 season.

The Wranglers won their first IFL National Championship in 2022, defeating the Quad City Steamwheelers 47–45.

Current roster

Statistics

Season-by-season results

References

External links
 Northern Arizona Wranglers official site

2020 establishments in Arizona
American football teams in Arizona
Indoor Football League teams
American football teams established in 2020
Sports in Prescott Valley, Arizona